The Bearpaw River is a  tributary of the Kantishna River in central Alaska in the United States. Variant names include Ch'edraya' No', Ch'edzaaye' No', Ch'edzaaye' No', Hutl'ot, and Ch'idraya' No'.

References

Rivers of Denali Borough, Alaska
Rivers of Alaska